The Cheptsa  is a river in the north part of Udmurtian Republic (Udmurtia) and eastern Kirov Oblast, in Russia. It flows through the city Glazov and flows into the Vyatka in Kirovo-Chepetsk, east of Kirov.

References

Rivers of Udmurtia
Rivers of Kirov Oblast